Oxley Green is a hamlet on the B1023 road, in between the villages of Tiptree and Tolleshunt D'Arcy, in the Maldon District of Essex.

References 
A-Z Essex, 2010 edition. p. 14.

Hamlets in Essex
Maldon District